Sittin' Pretty is the second album by the Scottish band The Pastels, released in 1989. "Nothing to Be Done" was featured in the soundtrack of 1998's film adaptation of Irvine Welsh's novel The Acid House.

Critical reception
Trouser Press wrote that "while there’s nothing new in Sittin’ Pretty‘s off-key awkwardness and gawky grooves (for the first time, the Pastels sound like they’re consciously trying to sound like themselves), this outing from the monsters of twee is not without its gems." The New York Times wrote that the album "has melodies as simple as nursery rhymes, cut to shreds by brazen, bullying guitar solos." Martin C. Strong wrote that the album "featured some of the sweetest, juiciest moments in The Pastels’ chequered career." The Herald called the album "a small but perfectly formed eccentricity in which the spirits of Iggy Pop, Jonathan Richman, and the Velvet Underground combine in wistful splendour."

Track listing

Personnel
Stephen Pastel – guitar, vocals, design
Brian Taylor – guitar
Martin Hayward – bass, guitar
Bernice Simpson – drums
Annabel Wright – keyboards, design, vocals
David Keegan – guitar
Sophie Pragnell – viola
Eugene Kelly – vocals
Nicole Geddes – cello
Richard Mazda – harmonica, percussion, producer, autoharp
Neil Ross & Mark Smith – engineer
Dougie McBride – photography

References 

1989 albums
The Pastels albums
Albums produced by Richard Mazda